PTV Sports HD is a 24-hour sports channel owned by the Pakistan Television Corporation, Pakistan's state broadcaster. PTV Sports was launched on 14 January 2012, with its HD broadcasts beginning on 26 January 2022, the start date of the 2022 Pakistan Super League. It broadcasts many sporting events, including, Cricket, Football, Hockey, Snooker, Tennis.

Programming

International Cricket

Continental Cricket

Domestic Cricket

Country Cricket

Country Professional Cricket Leagues

Country Professional Football Leagues

International Hockey

Continental Hockey

Country Professional Mixed Martial Arts

World Snooker Association:-

Country Professional Snooker Championship:-

Summer Olympics:-

Winter Olympics:-

Country Professional Grand Slams Tennis:-

Featured programmes

Game On Hai!
Game On Hai! is an analysis programme of PTV Sports. The Show is hosted by Dr. Nauman Niaz and is accompanied by Saqlain Mushtaq, Waqar Younis, Wasim Akram, Rashid Latif, Shoaib Akhtar, Mohammad Wasim and other guest retired cricketers from different countries. During the 2015 ICC Cricket World Cup, Game On Hai! hosted Herschelle Gibbs and Jonty Rhodes. Then, throughout the ensuing Zimbabwe tour of Pakistan in 2015, the show hosted Alastair Campbell. During the Pakistan tour of Sri Lanka in 2015, the show hosted Sanath Jayasuriya followed by Dean Jones, Mark Butcher and Herschelle Gibbs for the England tour of UAE against Pakistan in December of the same year. Most recently during the entire duration of the 2017 ICC Champions Trophy, the show featured Ian Chappell of Australia, as well as Viv Richards and Brian Lara of the West Indies.

Sports Circle
Sports Circle is the flagship program of PTV Sports. The show is hosted by Muhammad Ali Sanwal and he is accompanied by retired cricketer Aamir Sohail. The show was previously hosted by Nauman Niaz. There are several other programs catering to other sports events such as field hockey.

Keh dein jo kehna hai 
This is a new program started on PTV Sports. Presented by Mirza Iqbal Baig, it features analysis over different sport events.

See also
 List of sports television channels
 Sport in Pakistan
 Grand Slam
 National Games of Pakistan
 List of cricket commentators

References 

Pakistan Television Corporation
Sports television in Pakistan
Television stations in Pakistan
Television channels and stations established in 2012
Television stations in Islamabad